Jacoba Francisca Maria "Cobie" Smulders (born April 3, 1982) is a Canadian actress. She is known for her starring role as Robin Scherbatsky in the CBS sitcom How I Met Your Mother (2005–2014) and as S.H.I.E.L.D. agent Maria Hill in the Marvel Cinematic Universe superhero films The Avengers (2012), Captain America: The Winter Soldier (2014), Avengers: Age of Ultron (2015), Avengers: Infinity War (2018), Avengers: Endgame (2019), and Spider-Man: Far From Home (2019), as well as the ABC action drama series Agents of S.H.I.E.L.D (2013–2015), the Disney+ animated anthology series What If...? (2021), and the upcoming Disney+ limited series Secret Invasion (2023). 

Smulders' other films include Safe Haven (2013), They Came Together (2014), Results (2015), and Jack Reacher: Never Go Back (2016). She also starred in the Netflix comedy drama series A Series of Unfortunate Events (2017), the Netflix comedy series Friends from College (2017–2019), the ABC crime drama series Stumptown (2019–2020), and the FX true crime series Impeachment: American Crime Story (2021).

Early life
Smulders was born in Vancouver, British Columbia, to a Dutch father and a British mother. She was raised in White Rock, British Columbia, and later moved to the affluent West Point Grey neighbourhood to attend high school at Lord Byng Secondary School. She was named after her great-aunt, from whom she gained the nickname "Cobie". Smulders describes herself as "a fluent listener" of French. She has four sisters. Smulders was also a member of the Girl Guides of Canada as a child, participating as a Brownie (Girl Guide program for 7- to 10-year-olds).

Smulders worked in modeling, which she later said she "kind of hated", adding that the experience made her hesitant about pursuing acting as a career: "You know, you go into these rooms, and I've had the experience of people judging you physically for so long and I was over that but, then it was like... 'Oh no, I have to actually perform. I have to do well, and I have to have a voice... and I have to have thoughts now.'

In her youth, Smulders aspired to be a marine biologist. She took an interest in theatre throughout high school and briefly studied at the University of Victoria before returning to acting.

Career

Smulders' first acting role was as a guest in the Showtime science-fiction series Jeremiah; she subsequently made multiple appearances on television, including a recurring role on The L Word. Her first role as a series regular was in the short-lived ABC series Veritas: The Quest, which ran for one season. After the cancellation of Veritas, Smulders was cast as television reporter Robin Scherbatsky on the CBS sitcom How I Met Your Mother in 2005. The show continued for nine seasons, winning 10 Emmy Awards. In June 2010, Smulders made her off-Broadway debut in Love, Loss, and What I Wore at the Westside Theatre.

Smulders played Maria Hill in the 2012 film The Avengers. She received training from a Los Angeles SWAT team trainer to handle guns to portray the character. Smulders has since reprised the role in three episodes of the television series Agents of S.H.I.E.L.D., and in the films Captain America: The Winter Soldier (2014), Avengers: Age of Ultron (2015), Avengers: Infinity War (2018), Avengers: Endgame (2019), and Spider-Man: Far From Home (2019). 

In 2013, Smulders had a supporting role in the romance film Safe Haven. She also starred in the comedy-drama Delivery Man and They Came Together. Smulders voiced a Lego version of Wonder Woman in the 2014 animated film The Lego Movie. It was the first time the Wonder Woman character had a theatrical film appearance. In July 2015, Smulders was reported to have exited the made-for-TV film Confirmation because she had broken her leg; Zoe Lister-Jones was then confirmed to replace her in the role of Harriet Grant.

In 2016, she appeared in the comedy-drama The Intervention and the action adventure film Jack Reacher: Never Go Back opposite Tom Cruise. In 2017, she played the recurring character "Mother" in the Netflix series A Series of Unfortunate Events. From 2017 to 2019, she starred in the Netflix original series, Friends from College, in the main role of Lisa Turner. She starred as Dexedrine "Dex" Parios, a PTSD-stricken military veteran turned private detective, in the ABC crime drama Stumptown, which premiered on September 25, 2019.

In 2022, she returned to the role of Robin Charles Scherbatsky for the first season finale of the HIMYM spinoff How I Met Your Father, which airs on Hulu, titled "Timing is Everything".

Personal life
Smulders became engaged to Taran Killam in January 2009 after meeting him at a mutual friend's party four years earlier. They married on September 8, 2012, in Solvang, California. The couple resides in Pacific Palisades, California. They have two daughters, born in 2009 and 2015.

In 2015, Smulders revealed she had been diagnosed with ovarian cancer at age 25, while shooting season three of How I Met Your Mother in 2007. She had surgery to remove two tumors from her ovaries, but the cancer had spread to her lymph nodes, resulting in the need for multiple operations over the course of two years. In August 2019, Smulders revealed she is in remission.

In 2020, Smulders announced that she became an American citizen, while still retaining her Canadian citizenship. She stated that part of her motivation to become an American citizen was due to the 2020 presidential election.

Charity work
Smulders filmed a public service announcement with Oceana, an international ocean-conservation organization, in 2014. In May 2020, she released a clip parodying "Let's Go to the Mall", a song her character performed on How I Met Your Mother, titled "Let's All Stay at Home", to encourage the public to enforce COVID-19 lockdowns. Smulders also encouraged fans to donate to Save the Children, Canada Helps and the Daily Bread Food Bank amidst the pandemic. In September 2020, she promoted cleaning up refuse and litter with National CleanUp Day, Clean Trails and Planet Oat. "And I'm hoping people get out and can see that for themselves, and hopefully they'll take a stand to help the planet."

Filmography

Film

Television

Theatre

Awards and nominations

Notes

References

External links

 
 
 Cobie Smulders How I Met Your Mother biography at CBS

1982 births
Living people
21st-century Canadian actresses
21st-century American actresses
Actresses from Vancouver
Female models from British Columbia
Canadian film actresses
Canadian television actresses
Canadian voice actresses
Canadian stage actresses
American female models
American film actresses
American television actresses
American voice actresses
American stage actresses
Canadian emigrants to the United States
People with acquired American citizenship
Canadian people of Dutch descent
Canadian people of British descent
American people of Dutch descent
American people of British descent
Theatre World Award winners
Canadian child models
Canadian expatriate actresses in the United States